Ciclista Lima Association is a Peruvian football club, playing in the city of Lima. It is the second oldest club in Peru.

The club was founded 1896 and plays in the Copa Perú, which is the third division of the Peruvian league.

History
The club was the 1944, 1946, 1949, and 1993 Segunda División Peruana champion.

The club played at the highest level of Peruvian football on several occasions since 1927. However, they only played Torneo Descentralizado on three occasions, from 1994 Torneo Descentralizado until 1996 Torneo Descentralizado when the club was relegated to the Peruvian Segunda División.

In the 1997 Segunda División Peruana, the club was relegated to the Copa Perú.

Notable players

Honours

National
Torneo Apertura:
Runner-up (1): 1994 

Peruvian Segunda División:
Winners (3): 1944, 1946,  1993
Runner-up (2): 1949, 1992

Regional
Liga Provincial de Lima:
Winners (1): 1937

Liga Regional de Lima y Callao:
Winners (1): 1942

Liga Distrital de Chorrillos - Tercera División:
Winners (2): 2011, 2013

Performance in CONMEBOL competitions
Copa CONMEBOL: 1 appearance
1995: First Round

See also
List of football clubs in Peru
Peruvian football league system

References

Association football clubs established in 1896
Football clubs in Lima